Ma. Catalina L. Loreto-Go also known as Nene L. Go (born February 5, 1962 in Baybay, Leyte) is a former member of the House of Representatives of the Philippines, representing the Fifth District. She is the daughter of former Mayor of Baybay and congressional representative Eriberto V. Loreto.

References

1962 births
Living people
Members of the House of Representatives of the Philippines from Leyte (province)
Women members of the House of Representatives of the Philippines